Miniopterus bat coronavirus HKU8 (Bat-CoV HKU8) is an enveloped, single-stranded positive-sense RNA virus species in the genus Alphacoronavirus with a corona-like morphology. It causes severe acute respiratory syndrome in bats. Isolates have not been found in humans.

Genome 
The coronaviruses are among the largest RNA viruses, with complex polyadenylated genomes of 26–32 kb, and are divided into four genera: alpha, beta, gamma, and deltacoronaviruses. The Alpha and betacoronaviruses are derived from the bat gene pool. There are at least four different, but closely related, Alphacoronaviruses (bat-CoV 1A, 1B, HKU7 and HKU8) circulating in bent-winged bats. Coronaviruses in bats are descended from a common ancestor and have been evolving in bats over a long period of time.

A significant percentage of newly emerging viruses are RNA viruses. It is believed this is due to the fact that RNA viruses have a much higher nucleotide mutation rate than DNA viruses.

Habitat
The common bent-wing bat is ubiquitous around the world and can be found in the following countries: Afghanistan, Albania, Algeria, Armenia, Australia, Austria, Azerbaijan, Bosnia and Herzegovina, Bulgaria, Cameroon, China, Croatia, Dominican Republic, possibly Ethiopia, France, Georgia, Gibraltar, Greece, Guinea, Hungary, India, Indonesia, Iran, Iraq, Israel, Italy, Japan, Jordan, possibly Kenya, North Korea, South Korea, Laos, Lebanon, Liberia, Libya, Malaysia, Malta, Montenegro, Morocco, Myanmar, Nepal, Nigeria, North Macedonia, Pakistan, Palestine, Papua New Guinea, Philippines, Portugal, Romania, Russian Federation, San Marino, Saudi Arabia, Serbia, Sierra Leone, Slovakia, Slovenia, Solomon Islands, Spain, Sri Lanka, Switzerland, Syria, Taiwan, Tajikistan, Thailand, Tunisia, Turkey, Turkmenistan, Vietnam, and Yemen.

See also
Common bent-wing bat
Severe acute respiratory syndrome (SARS)

References

Alphacoronaviruses
Animal viral diseases
Bat virome
Bat diseases